Nyo Saw is a Burmese military officer and chairman of the Myanmar Economic Corporation (MEC), one of two major conglomerates owned by the Burmese military.

Early life and education 
Nyo Saw graduated from the 23rd intake of the Defence Services Academy.

Career 

Nyo Saw began his career as a grade one general staff officer at the Yangon command. He served as the commandant of the Defence Services Technological Academy and the Defence Services Academy, and also headed the country's central and southern commands.

Nyo Saw served as quartermaster general from 2014 to April 2020, before retiring with the rank of lieutenant general. He was succeeded by Kyaw Swar Lin. In the wake of the 2015 Myanmar general election, which saw the National League for Democracy take control of the civilian government, Nyo Saw was integral in awarding government tenders to firms affiliated with military officers.

As of August 2022, he serves as the chairman of the Myanmar Economic Corporation, and holds senior roles at the military-owned Myanma Economic Holdings Limited and Innwa Bank.

Personal life 
Nyo Saw is married to San San.

References 

Burmese generals
Living people
Year of birth missing (living people)
Defence Services Academy alumni